The Sanctuary of Pandion is the name sometimes given to the remains of a building located in the south-east corner of the Acropolis of Athens. Its foundations were found during the excavations for the construction of the Old Acropolis Museum (1865–1874).

The 40m by 17m rectangular open-air building, dating to the later 5th century, was divided into two nearly equal parts by a wall. It faced west-northwest and was entered through a projecting portico on the western side.

The name stems from the presumption that this was the location of the heroon (hero shrine) of Pandion, the eponymous hero of the Attic tribe Pandionis (usually assumed to be one of the two legendary kings of Athens, Pandion I or Pandion II), which was known to be located somewhere on the Acropolis.

Notes

References
 Jones, Nicholas F., The Associations of Classical Athens : The Response to Democracy: The Response to Democracy, Oxford University Press, 1999. .
 Pausanias, Pausanias Description of Greece with an English Translation by W.H.S. Jones, Litt.D., and H.A. Ormerod, M.A., in 4 Volumes. Cambridge, Massachusetts, Harvard University Press; London, William Heinemann Ltd. 1918. Online version at the Perseus Digital Library.
 Robertson, Noel (1996), "Athena's Shrines and Festivals" in Worshipping Athena: Panathenaia and Parthenon, The University of Wisconsin Press.

External links
The Sanctuary of Pandion
Sanctuary of Pandion

Acropolis of Athens
Ancient Greek buildings and structures in Athens
Ancient Greek sanctuaries in Greece
5th-century BC religious buildings and structures